Charles B. MacDonald (November 23, 1922 – December 4, 1990) was a former Deputy Chief Historian for the United States Army. He wrote several of the Army's official histories of World War II.

War service 

After graduating from Presbyterian College, MacDonald was commissioned as a US Army officer through ROTC and deployed to Europe. By September 1944, as a 21-year-old captain, he commanded a rifle company in the 23rd Infantry Regiment. His company was intended to be part of the effort to capture the Huertgen Forest. They had been transferred north from the area which was, soon after, overrun by the Germans in the first moves of the Battle of the Bulge. They were redeployed to defend a crossroads against the German advance. After delaying the Germans long enough to allow the rest of MacDonald's division to deploy, they withdrew. He received the Silver Star for the action.

While leading his company in a counterattack, MacDonald was wounded on January 17, 1945. After two months convalescence, he was given command of another company in his old regiment, which he led until the end of the war. He also received the Purple Heart.

Historian 

His first book, Company Commander, was published in 1947, while his wartime experiences were fresh in his mind.
Charles B. MacDonald was the author of The Siegfried Line Campaign and co-author of Three Battles: Arnaville, Altuzzo, and Schmidt, both in the official series United States Army in World War II. He supervised the preparation of other volumes in the European and Mediterranean theater military history subseries and contributed to Command Decisions and American Military History. He authored Company Commander (Washington: 1947), The Battle of the Huertgen Forest (Philadelphia: 1963), The Mighty Endeavor (New York: 1969), and Airborne (New York: 1970).

In 1957 he received a Secretary of the Army Research and Study Fellowship and spent a year studying the interrelationship of terrain, weapons, and tactics on European battlefields. He wrote the final volume of the Green Series on the European Theatre, The Last Offensive. He retired as Deputy Chief Historian, United States Army Center of Military History in 1979.

After his retirement, MacDonald wrote A Time for Trumpets, his last book, a personal history of the Ardennes Offensive which concentrates on the first two weeks of the battle, which he spent five years researching.

MacDonald became ill with cancer and lung disease, and died on December 4, 1990 at his home in Arlington, Virginia, at the age of 68.

Works 
 Company Commander
 Airborne
 The Mighty Endeavor: American Armed Forces in the European Theater in World War II
 On a Field of Red: The Communist International and the Coming of World War II (with Anthony Cave Brown)
 The Battle of the Huertgen Forest
 A Time for Trumpets

References

External links 
Perseus Books thumbnail biography

1922 births
1990 deaths
Military personnel from South Carolina
United States Army officers
United States Army historians
American male non-fiction writers
American non-fiction writers
United States Army personnel of World War II
Burials at Arlington National Cemetery
People from Little Rock, South Carolina
Historians of World War II
Deaths from cancer in Virginia
Recipients of the Silver Star
20th-century American historians